Will Hollyday (died 22 December 1697) was Captain of the Ragged Regiment of the Black Guards. He eventually resigned his commission and resorted to being a highwayman, for which he was executed on 22 December 1697.

References

English highwaymen
1697 deaths
Year of birth unknown